Horacio Gallardo Burgos (born May 29, 1981) is a Bolivian former professional road bicycle racer. He competed in the men's individual road race at the 2008 Summer Olympics.

Major results

2005
 1st  Road race, National Road Championships
2007
 1st  Road race, National Road Championships
 Doble Sucre Potosí GP Cemento Fancesa
1st Points classification
1st Stage 1
 1st Stage 2 Doble Copacabana GP Fides
2008
 1st  Road race, National Road Championships
2009
 9th Overall Vuelta a Bolivia
1st Stage 9
2011
 1st Points classification, Vuelta a Bolivia
2012
 1st  Road race, National Road Championships
 1st Stage 5 Vuelta a Bolivia
2013
 1st Points classification, Vuelta a Bolivia
2016
 2nd Road race, National Road Championships
2018
 2nd Road race, National Road Championships

External links 

Bolivian male cyclists
Cyclists at the 2008 Summer Olympics
Olympic cyclists of Bolivia
1981 births
Living people
People from Tarija
21st-century Bolivian people
20th-century Bolivian people